The 1832 United States presidential election in Vermont took place between November 2 and December 5, 1832, as part of the 1832 United States presidential election. Voters chose seven representatives, or electors to the Electoral College, who voted for President and Vice President.

Vermont voted for the Anti-Masonic Party candidate, William Wirt, over the National Republican candidate, Henry Clay, and the Democratic Party candidate, Andrew Jackson. Vermont was the only state in the country that Wirt carried in 1832, by a margin of 6.08%. As of 2017, Wirt's performance remains the best-ever by a third-party Presidential candidate in any Northeastern state, constitutes the solitary occasion a third-party candidate has carried any New England state, and the only time a person from Maryland has ever won an electoral vote for the Presidency from pledged electors. (Spiro Agnew of Maryland would in 1968 and 1972 win the electoral vote for the vice presidency.) 

While Vermont was the only state that voted for Wirt, it would only prove to be his second strongest in terms of popular vote percentage, the first being Pennsylvania with 42.04 percentage points. In Pennsylvania, no ticket for Henry Clay was run, allowing Wirt to consolidate the Anti-Jackson vote.

Results

See also
 United States presidential elections in Vermont

Notes

References

Vermont
1832
1832 Vermont elections